Lieutenant-General Sir John Abercromby  or Abercrombie GCB (2 April 1772 – 14 February 1817) was a British Army officer and Member of Parliament (MP) for Clackmannanshire from 1815 to 1817.

Family and early life
John Abercromby was born the son of Lt.-Gen. Sir Ralph Abercromby and Mary Abercromby, 1st Baroness Abercromby. He had an elder brother George, who was born in 1770, and two younger brothers, of whom James was born in 1776 and Alexander in 1784. Abercromby also had three sisters, Anne, Mary, and Catherine.

Career

1782-1802
Abercromby entered the army in 1782 as a cornet in the 4th Dragoons, transferring in 1786 as an ensign to the 75th Highland Regiment. He gained promotion to lieutenant in 1787, and to captain in 1792. He subsequently served as an ADC to his father during campaigns in Flanders (1793–1794), the West Indies (1796–1797), Ireland (1798) and against the Batavian Republic (1799). Promoted to colonel in 1800, he left his father's staff, but became deputy adjutant general and served under General Hutchinson in the force led by his father to Egypt (1801). His father died in battle at Alexandria; but John continued to render admirable service, for which General Hutchinson commended him.

1803-1817
When war broke out anew in 1803 the French detained Abercromby whilst he was travelling in France and imprisoned him at Verdun for the next five years. During his captivity he received promotion to major-general in 1805 and the appointment for life as colonel of the 53rd Regiment of Foot in 1807.  Exchanged in 1808 for General Brenier, he became Commander-in-Chief of the Bombay Army in 1809. From there he led the forces that captured Mauritius in 1810, returning to Bombay in 1811. 

In 1813, he transferred to become Commander-in-Chief of the Madras Army and temporary acting Governor of Madras, with promotion to lieutenant-general. The Indian climate had broken his health, however, and he had to return to Britain at the end of 1813, where he was appointed Knight Commander of the Order of the Bath.

He was elevated to Knight Grand Cross of the Order of the Bath in 1815, and succeeded his elder brother George as Member of Parliament (MP) for Clackmannanshire. However, his worsening health drove him to the Continent, and he died in Marseilles in 1817.

See also
Records of members of parliament of the United Kingdom

References

 The Gazetteer for Scotland
 thePeerage.com

External links 
 
 

 

|-
 

|-
 

|-

1772 births
1817 deaths
British Army lieutenant generals
Knights Grand Cross of the Order of the Bath
UK MPs 1812–1818
Gordon Highlanders officers
British Army personnel of the French Revolutionary Wars
People of the Irish Rebellion of 1798
British Army personnel of the Napoleonic Wars
Napoleonic Wars prisoners of war held by France
British prisoners of war (Napoleonic Wars)
Commanders-in-chief of Bombay
Whig (British political party) MPs for Scottish constituencies
John
Younger sons of barons
Politicians awarded knighthoods